The 1991–92 Northern Counties East Football League season was the 10th in the history of Northern Counties East Football League, a football competition in England. The league consisted of only two divisions after Division Two was disbanded at the end of the previous season. Most of Division Two clubs were promoted to Division One.

Premier Division

The Premier Division featured 15 clubs which competed in the previous season, along with four new clubs, promoted from Division One:
Eccleshill United
Glasshoughton Welfare
Liversedge
Sheffield

Map

League table

Division One

Division One featured seven clubs which competed in the previous season, along with nine new clubs.
Clubs promoted from Division Two:
Bradley Rangers
Brodsworth Welfare
Hall Road Rangers
Immingham Town
Stocksbridge Park Steels
Tadcaster Albion
Worsbrough Bridge Miners Welfare
Yorkshire Amateur
Plus:
Rossington Main, joined from the Central Midlands League

Map

League table

References

1991-92
8